Alec Scheiner (born 1973 in Lower Merion, Pennsylvania) is a Partner at RedBird Capital Partners, helping lead its sports practice. Previously, Alec served as President of the Cleveland Browns and Senior Vice President of the Dallas Cowboys.

Early life 
Scheiner was born and grew up in Lower Merion, Pennsylvania. After graduating high school in 1988, he attended Georgetown University, graduating with degrees in economics and Latin American studies in 1992. He then attended the Georgetown University Law Center, where he graduated with a J.D. degree in 1997.

Law career
After law school, Scheiner became a lawyer, working at the law firm of Wilmer, Cutler, and Pickering (now WilmerHale), where he practiced from 1997 to 2004.

NFL career 
In 2004, Scheiner was hired by the NFL's Dallas Cowboys to be their general counsel. Four years later, he was promoted to vice president, where he was a key player in the day-to-day business operations of the team, as well as a point man for the building of the new Cowboys Stadium (now AT&T Stadium). In 2010, Scheiner was named to Sports Business Journal's "40 Under 40" list of top young sports executives.

On December 18, 2012, Scheiner left the Cowboys to become president of the Cleveland Browns, where he is in charge of all business operations for the team.

On March 4, 2016 Scheiner announced that he would be leaving his role as team president effective March 31.  He will stay on with the Browns as a consultant for the remainder of the year.

In 2016, Scheiner left the Cleveland Browns and joined RedBird Capital Partners. He has helped lead sports investments in OneTeam Partners (a partnership with the NFLPA and MLBPA) and Toulouse FC (and sits on the boards of each) and is the CEO of RedBall Acquisition Corp, a Special Purpose Acquisition Company with Billy Beane and Gerry Cardinale serving as co-chairman. Scheiner also helped lead RedBird’s $750M investment in Fenway Sports Group.

Personal 
Scheiner has three children - daughter Norah, and sons Rafe and Max.

References 

Cleveland Browns executives
People from Lower Merion Township, Pennsylvania
1973 births
Living people